Blumeria graminis (commonly called barley powdery mildew or corn mildew) is a fungus that causes powdery mildew on grasses, including cereals. It is the only species in the genus Blumeria. It has also been called Erysiphe graminis and (by its anamorph) Oidium monilioides or Oidium tritici.

Systematics 
Previously B. graminis was included within the genus Erysiphe, but molecular studies have placed it into a clade of its own. Thus since 1975, the species graminis was moved into the new genus Blumeria of which it is the only species.
Blumeria differs from Erysiphe in its digitate haustoria and in details of the conidial wall. As well Blumeria is considered to be phylogenetically distinct from Erisiphe as it is a plant pathogen that hosts solely on the true grasses of Poaceae. 

Eight special forms or formae speciales (ff.spp.) of B. graminis have been distinguished, each of which is parasitic on a particular genus of grasses. Those that infect crop plants are B. g. f.sp. , which causes powdery mildew of wheat and infects other grasses in the genera Triticum and Aegilops, f.sp.  on barley, f.sp.  on oats and f.sp.  on rye. (ryegrass).

Morphology 
The mycelium can cover the plant surface almost completely, especially the upper sides of leaves. Ascocarp is dark brown, globose with filamentous appendages, asci oblong. Ascospores hyaline, ellipsoid, 20–30 x 10–13 µm in size. Anamorph produces on hyaline conidiophores catenate conidia of oblong to cylindrical shape, not including fibrosin bodies, 32–44 x 12–15 µm in size. Haustoria are palmate.

B. graminis is unique among the Erysiphales by having conidia with a primary germ tube and finger-shaped ("digitate") appressoria.

Taxonomy 
The genus name of Blumeria is in honour of Samuel Blumer (b. 1895), a Swiss botanist (Mycology), Phytopathology, from the University of Bern (Universität Bern).

The genus was circumscribed by Golovin ex Speer in Sydowia Vol.27 on page 2 in 1975.

Ecology 
B. graminis asexually produces conidia and sexually forms ascospores.

Conidia are mainly distributed by wind, pests, or human activities. The water initiating ascospores are hypothesized to be dispersed not only by wind but also by splashing water-droplets.

It is biotrophic, and does not grow on synthetic media. Relatively cool and humid conditions are favourable for its growth. Its relatively great genetic variability enables it often to infect previously resistant plant varieties.

Genetics 
The genome of B. g. f. sp. hordei has recently been sequenced., as well as the genome of B. g. f. sp. tritici.
Sequencing of the genome of the wheat powdery mildew B. g. f. sp. tritici, has allowed inference of important aspects of its evolution. It has been seen that it is the most repetitive fungal genome sequenced with 90% transposable elements. Additionally, 6540 genes were annotated, from which 437 encoded candidate secretor proteins and 165 for non-secreted candidate secretor proteins. These were shown to be subject to positive selection, due to their implication in the gene-for-gene relationship to defeat plant disease resistance. 
The ability to infect tetraploid- as well as domesticated hexaploid wheat, was seen to be the result of mildew genomes being mosaics of ancient haplogroups that existed before wheat domestication. This has allowed wheat powdery mildew to maintain genetic flexibility, variability and thus a great potential for pathogen variation. It is hypothesized that this mosacisism can be maintained through clonal reproduction in populations with a small effective size or quasi-clonal reproduction in populations with large effective size.

Powdery mildew of wheat is relatively easy to diagnose due to the characteristic little white spots of cotton-like mycelia. These can appear on the upper and lower epidermis of the leaves. As the disease progresses they become a light tan color. B. g. f. sp. tritici is an obligate parasite which means it only grows on living tissue. Though present throughout wheat growing regions, it especially favors the eastern seaboard of the United States as well as coastal regions of the United Kingdom.

Hosts and symptoms 
Triticum spp. (wheat) is the only host of B. g. f. sp. tritici. Signs on the foliage of wheat are white, powdery mycelium and conidia. As the disease progresses, the patches turn gray and small dark black or brown cleistothecia form in the mycelium mass. Symptoms progress from lower to upper leaves. Symptoms of powdery mildew are chlorotic areas surrounding the infected areas. The lower leaf surface corresponding to the mycelial mat will also show chlorosis. Lower leaves are commonly the most infected because of higher humidity around them.

Disease cycle 
B. g. f. sp. tritici has a polycyclic life cycle typical of its phylum, Ascomycota.  Powdery mildew of wheat overwinters as cleistothecia dormant in plant debris.  Under warmer conditions, however, the fungus can overwinter as asexual conidia or mycelium on living host plants.  It can persist between seasons most likely as ascospores in wheat debris left in the field.  Ascospores are sexual spores produced from the cleistothecia.  These spores, as well as conidia, serve as the primary inoculum and are dispersed by wind.  Neither spore requires free water to germinate, only high relative humidity. Wheat powdery mildew thrives in cool humid conditions and cloudy weather increases chances of disease.
When conidia land on a wheat leaf's hydrophobic surface cuticle, they release proteins which facilitate active transport of lightweight anions between leaf and fungus even before germination.  This process helps Blumeria recognize that it is on the correct host and directs growth of the germ tube.  
Both ascospores and conidia germinate directly with a germ tube. Conidia can recognize the host plant and within one minute of initial contact, the direction of germ tube growth is determined.  The development of appressoria then begins infection following the growth of a germ tube.  After initial infection, the fungus produces haustoria inside of the wheat cells and mycelium grows on the plant's outer surface.  Powdery mildew of wheat produces conidia during the growing season as often as every 7 to 10 days.  These conidia function as secondary inoculum as growth and reproduction repeat throughout the growing season.

Environment 
Powdery mildew of wheat thrives in cool, humid climates and proliferates in cloudy weather conditions. The pathogen can also be an issue in drier climates if wheat fields are irrigated. Dense, genetically similar plantings provide opportune conditions for growth of powdery mildew.

Management 
Controlling the disease involves eliminating conducive conditions as much as possible by altering planting density and carefully timing applications and rates of nitrogen. Since nitrogen fertilizers encourage dense leafy growth, nitrogen should be applied at precise rates, less than 70 pounds per acre, to control decrease severity.  Crop rotation with non-host plants is another way to keep mildew infection to a minimum, however the aerial nature of conidia and ascospore dispersal makes it of limited use.  Wheat powdery mildew can also be controlled by eliminating the presence of volunteer wheat in agricultural fields as well as tilling under crop residues.

Chemical control is possible with fungicides such as triadimefon and propiconazole. Another chemical treatment involves treating wheat with a silicon solution or calcium silicate slag.  Silicon helps the plant cells defend against fungal attack by degrading haustoria and by producing callose and papilla.  With silicon treatment, epidermal cells are less susceptible to powdery mildew of wheat.

Milk has long been popular with home gardeners and small-scale organic growers as a treatment for powdery mildew. Milk is diluted with water (typically 1:10) and sprayed on susceptible plants at the first sign of infection, or as a preventative measure, with repeated weekly application often controlling or eliminating the disease. Studies have shown milk's effectiveness as comparable to some conventional fungicides, and better than benomyl and fenarimol at higher concentrations. Milk has proven effective in treating powdery mildew of summer squash, pumpkins, grapes, and roses. The exact mechanism of action is unknown, but one known effect is that ferroglobulin, a protein in whey, produces oxygen radicals when exposed to sunlight, and contact with these radicals is damaging to the fungus.

Another way to control wheat powdery mildew is breeding in genetic resistance, using "R genes" (resistance genes) to prevent infection. There are at least 25 loci on the wheat genome that encode resistance to powdery mildew. If the particular variety of wheat has only one loci for resistance, the pathogen may be controlled only for a couple years. If, however, the variety of wheat has multiple loci for resistance, the crop may be protected for around 15 years. Because finding these loci can be difficult and time-consuming, molecular markers are used to facilitate combining resistant genomes. With these markers established, researchers will then be able to determine the most effective combination of resistance genes.

 is an HSP70  a family of heat shock proteins  in Arabidopsis. The ortholog  in barley (Hordeum vulgare) is disclosed by Molitor et al., 2011. They find that it is transcribed in response to B. graminis infection, is protective against Bg infection, and that prophylactic infection with Piriformospora indica produces systemic induced resistsance to Bg.

Genetics
It is the most repetitive fungal genome sequenced  with 90% transposable elements. 6540 genes have been annotated, a number similar to that in yeasts, but lower than for the rest of fungal genomes. The analysis of these genes has revealed a similar pattern to that found in other obligate biotrophs of lower presence of genes implied in primary and secondary metabolism.

Evolution of Blumeria gramimis f.sp. tritici
Wheat powdery mildew is an obligate biotroph with a poorly understood evolutionary history. Sequencing its genome in 2013, many aspects of the evolution of its parasitism were unveiled. Obligate biotrophy has appeared multiple times in evolution in both ascomycetes like B. graminis and basidiomycetes, thus different selective pressure must have acted in the different organisms through time. 
It has been seen that B. g. f.sp. triticis genome is a mosaic of haplogroups with different divergence times, which explains its unique pathogen adaptability. Haplogroup Hold (diverged 40-80 mya) allows for the infection of wild tetraploid wheat and Hyoung (diverged 2-10 mya) allows for the infection of both domesticated hexaploid wheat.
It is hypothesized that this mosaicisms has been maintained through clonal propagation in populations with small effective size or through quasi-clonal propagation in populations with large effective size.
Additionally, it has been seen that there is a positive selective pressure acting on genes that code for candidate secretor proteins and non-secreted candidate secretor proteins, indicating that these might participate in the gene-for-gene relationship of plant disease resistance.

Importance
Powdery mildew can be found in all wheat growing areas of the United States but usually will be most severe in the east and southeast. It is more common in areas with a humid or semi-arid environment where wheat is grown. Powdery mildew has become a more important disease in some areas because of increased application of nitrogen fertilizer, which favors the development of the fungus.  Severe symptoms of powdery mildew can cause stunting of wheat. If unmanaged, this disease can reduce yields significantly by reducing photosynthetic areas and causes non-seed producing tillers. Powdery mildew causes reduced kernel size and lower yields. The sooner powdery mildew begins to develop and how high on the plant it develops by flowering the larger the yield loss. Yield Losses up to 45 percent have been shown in Ohio on susceptible varieties when plants are infected early and weather favors disease.

References

 Pietro D. Spanu et al., Genome Expansion and Gene Loss in Powdery Mildew Fungi Reveal Functional Tradeoffs in Parasitism, in: Science. December 10, 2010 
 British Erysiphales 
 
 NIAES, Microbial Systematics Lab page on Blumeria 
 Costamilan, 2005 

Fungi described in 1815
Leotiomycetes
Cereal diseases
Fungal plant pathogens and diseases